Ciarán Ó Lionáird (born 11 April 1988) is an Irish runner from Cork. He competed at the 2012 Summer Olympics in the 1500 metres. At the 2013 European Athletics Indoor Championships in March, he came 3rd in the Men's 3000 metres. Following the COVID-19 lockdown, he announced he was coming out of retirement, and his intention to compete in the Tokyo Olympics.

Early years 
Ciaran grew up just outside Macroom, County Cork, Ireland. He attended De La Salle College, Macroom, where he was an Irish Schools 1500 metre champion. Ciaran first took up running at age 7 with West Muskerry AC, but at age 12 joined Leevale to become coached by Der O'Donovan. It was at Leevale that Ciaran improved his times and ran an Irish Youths indoor record of 3:50 at age 16. He went on to win a bronze medal at the European Youth Olympic Festival in Lignano in 2005 as well as taking 10th place in the World Youth Championships, both over the metric mile.

NCAA 
In 2006, having finished school, Ciaran decided to take up a scholarship at the University of Michigan under Coach Ron Warhurst where he earned Academic All-Big Ten Conference three years in 2006, 2007 and 2008. After numerous season-ending injuries (osteitis pubis, L5 disc herniation, hip bursitis) he decided to transfer to Florida State University in 2009. A recurrence of Ciaran’s back disc injury in 2010 led to 6 months on the sidelines and with surgery imminent, he thought his running career might well be over. However, he battled through a summer of intense therapy and came back in the Autumn of 2010 to become All American at the NCAA Men's Division I Cross Country Championship.

Post College
At the 2011 IAAF World Championships in Daegu, Ciaran qualified through a tactical first round - tactical meaning slower than qualifying time of 3:36 pace for early part of the race where strategy of moving faster in latter parts of the race can be used to improve finish order. Ciaran ran 3:36 in the semi-final to qualify for the IAAF World championship final in his first Major Championship appearance. In the final of 2011 World Championships in Athletics – Men's 1500 metres, he placed 10th. Ciaran O'Lionaird of Ireland ran 3:50.12 at 2012 IAAF World Indoor Championships – Men's 1500 metres and placed 22nd. The 2011 World Championship provided him with valuable experience ahead of the London Olympics in 2012. Ciaran did not advance to semi-final at Athletics at the 2012 Summer Olympics – Men's 1500 metres. Ciarán O'Lionáird	 of Ireland ran 7:50.40 at 2013 European Athletics Indoor Championships – Men's 3000 metres earned a bronze medal. Ciarán Ó Lionáird ran 3:39.79 at 2014 European Athletics Championships – Men's 1500 metres to advance to the final.

References

External links 
 
 
 Ciaran O'Lionaird 2011 Florida State University Profile

1988 births
Living people
Sportspeople from Cork (city)
Athletes from the Republic of Ireland
Irish male middle-distance runners
Irish male long-distance runners
Olympic athletes of Ireland
Athletes (track and field) at the 2012 Summer Olympics
World Athletics Championships athletes for Ireland
Michigan Wolverines men's track and field athletes
Michigan Wolverines men's cross country runners
Florida State Seminoles men's track and field athletes
Florida State Seminoles men's cross country runners